Hesperilla chrysotricha, also known as the chrysotricha skipper or goldenhaired sedge-skipper, is a species of butterfly in the family Hesperiidae. It is found in the Australian states of Victoria, Tasmania, South Australia and Western Australia.

The wingspan is about 35 mm for males. Females are slightly larger.

The larvae feed on various sword grasses, including Gahnia decomposita, Gahnia deusta, Gahnia filum, Gahnia microstachya, Gahnia radula, Gahnia sieberiana and Gahnia trifida.

Subspecies
Hesperilla chrysotricha chrysotricha (Western Australia)
Hesperilla chrysotricha cyclospila (South Australia, Tasmania, Victoria)
Synonyms: 
Hesperilla chrysotricha leucospila Waterhouse, 1927 
Hesperilla chrysotricha plebeia Waterhouse, 1927 
Hesperilla chrysotricha leucosia Waterhouse, 1938 
Hesperilla chrysotricha lunawanna Couchman, 1949 
Hesperilla chrysotricha naua Couchman, 1949

External links
Australian Insects
Australian Faunal Directory

Trapezitinae
Fauna of South Australia
Fauna of Victoria (Australia)
Invertebrates of Tasmania
Fauna of Western Australia
Insects of Australia
Butterflies described in 1902